Carbon Copy Media was an Ohio-based independent record label, clothing company, and video production company founded by singer JT Woodruff of the rock band Hawthorne Heights. The label consisted of local bands in the Dayton, Ohio area. Victory Records has since signed former Carbon Copy Media bands, effectively taking over the label.

History
On January 9, 2006, it was announced that Hawthorne Heights frontman JT Woodruff and his business partner Mark Daily, started a record label, titled Carbon Copy Media. In the same announcement, it was mentioned that the label had signed Ellison and Asteria, and was expecting to release their debuts later in the year. The following month, Brighten and Ivory signed to the label. In April 2006, Signal Home signed with them.

The label had a distribution and upstream deal with Victory Records.

Former Artists
The following is a list of the former Artists on Carbon Copy Media
A Day in the Life
Brighten 
Ellison
Ivory
Signal Home
Asteria

See also 
List of record labels

References

External links 
 Official site
 Myspace Profile

American independent record labels
Record labels established in 2006